Novello da San Lucano (c.1435, San Severino Lucano – 1516, Alba Iulia) was an Italian architect and designer, mainly active in Naples.

He was probably born in San Severino Lucano, a fief of the Sanseverino family, for whom he produced most of his designs. He was ordained a brother and studied under Angelo Aniello Fiore as well as taking a trip to Rome. His works include the belltower of San Giovanni in Parco in the town of Mercato San Severino and the restoration of San Domenico Maggiore, Naples.

References

1435 births
1516 deaths
15th-century Italian architects
16th-century Italian architects
People from the Province of Potenza